Calderwood Castle was located in East Kilbride, Scotland. The castle was situated near the banks of the Rotten Calder Water in what is now Calderglen Country Park. Most likely constructed in the early to mid fifteenth century by the Maxwell family, the original peel tower collapsed in 1773. It was replaced by an extension to a large 18th-century country house called Calderwood House, which has itself since been demolished along with a later 1840s Gothic Revival addition.

History
An earlier building is suggested to have stood on the site or more likely a better defended former fort nearby to the north west, which allegedly belonged to the Barony of Mearns (Roland De Mernis); being passed to the Maxwells of Pollok through an alleged marriage not testified by extant genealogical records.

The first known castle built on the Calderglen site of the 'Dee of Calder' was a large rectangular tower house. It was constructed in the early 15th century as ascertained from stylistic designs known from images, as well as historical literature. This building, which is described as two adjoined towers with an extraordinarily thick middle wall, collapsed in January 1773 following several days of storms.

Later in the 18th century a mansion house was constructed on the site, which was extended in the 1840s. The latter development was executed in a spectacular form of Gothic Revival design, quite unique.  The design has now been attributed to David Rhind, who was prominent during the period and on personal terms with the Maxwells of Calderwood as well as advertising for the building works during the 1830s. This architect is also thought to have designed the Maxwellton Schoolhouse, within a small weaving village on the old Calderwood Estate, which is still in good preservation as a residential area within the new town of East Kilbride.

In 1904 the Calderwood estate was sold to the Scottish Co-operative Wholesale Society (SCWS), who used the estate for agriculture. They also opened up the glen as a pleasure ground, and briefly turned the castle into a co-operative museum. During the First World War, around 200 refugees from Belgium were housed in the castle. The country house fell into disrepair following its use for billeting troops during the Second World War as well as maintenance costs. Calderwood Glen Platform was opened on the Blantyre to East Kilbride line to serve the Calderwood Estate's visitors in 1907, closing in 1939.

The estate was purchased by East Kilbride Development Corporation in 1947, by which time most of the castle was already demolished. The remaining sections were demolished with explosives in 1951. Nothing now remains except half-buried ruins and rubble and the intact walled driveway terrace which fronted the building.

The now-ruined Craigneith Castle is located on the opposite side of the river, and served as a decorative folly, visible from Calderwood, as well as a viewing platform for the Calderwood Linn waterfall, and practically as servant quarters.

Depictions
A painting of the castle by Robert Purves Bell is in the collection of South Lanarkshire Council.

An engraving by A. Robertson after a sketch by Paul Sandby from c. 1750 depicts the castle viewed from the south. The engraving is recorded as having featured in Forsyth's Beauties of Scotland, although this book does not contain the engraving. The engraved view does appear in the August 1788 edition of the "Edinburgh Magazine or Literary Miscellany".  An original finished watercolour of the scene was sold a few decades ago privately by public auction. Sandby worked the latter view up from a simpler bistre sketch of the same view, upon which the later engraving is based. This original sketch is held by the National Library of Wales and originally belonged to the antiquarian and naturalist Thomas Pennant.

On the same visit Sandby produced a sketch of the Calderwood Linn which features on the back of a more well-known view by him of Bothwell Castle. This sketch was unknown until 2015 when Chris Ladds, a historian, found reference to a wash drawing of a waterfall named "Calderwood Linn on the Clyde". The Sandby sketch of the waterfall belonged to David Laing, a Scottish antiquarian, and is now in the collection of drawings held at the National Galleries of Scotland prints room, Edinburgh..

Another engraving features in facsimile in Castellated and Domestic Architecture of Scotland by MacGibbon & Ross, which is based upon an original sketch described as signed "W. Binton, 1765". It has been shown through examination of this sketch and similar that this actually reads "N. Britain", a reference to 'North Britain' as representing Scotland rather than a signature, and that the engraving is believed to be copied after a lost original by Sandby in addition to numerous others held by the King's topography collection at the British Library.  This confusion caused the drawing to be lost to those trying to find it for the past 100 years. It was rediscovered in 2015, again by Chris Ladds, and is also now held by the National Galleries of Scotland.

Calderwood name 

Calderwood Castle in the opinion of many genealogical groups is thought to have been anciently possessed by a family bearing the name Calderwood. In fact Calderwood is so ancient a title that it predates Castles in their modern interpretation. The documents regarding the ancient lands of Calderwood and family are scarce, but do suggest that the name descends from a small village or possibly a defended iron-age town (oppidum) as referred to in marriage charters. There were several Calderwood landholdings in the area, and the retainers on the lands would have gone by this name, rather than any fortification at the Dee of Calder.

See also 
 Maxwell of Calderwood baronetcy

References

External links 
 
 Calderwood Castle History Page run by EK historian Chris Ladds
 Secret Scotland Wiki: Calderwood Castle
 Calderwood Castle's fall, rise, and fall: The Blantyre Project, page run by Paul Veverka, Blantyre historian

15th-century establishments in Scotland
1951 disestablishments in Scotland
Buildings and structures completed in the 15th century
Buildings and structures in East Kilbride
Castles in South Lanarkshire
Clan Maxwell
Former castles in Scotland